Vida Dujmović is a Canadian computer scientist and mathematician known for her research in graph theory and graph algorithms, and particularly for graph drawing, for the structural theory of graph width parameters including treewidth and queue number, and for the use of these parameters in the parameterized complexity of graph drawing. She is an associate professor of electrical engineering & computer science at the University of Ottawa.

Education
Dujmović studied telecommunications and computer science as an undergraduate at the University of Zagreb, graduating in 1996. She came to McGill University for graduate study in computer science, earning a master's degree in 2000 and completing her Ph.D. in 2004. Her dissertation, Track Layouts of Graphs, was supervised by Sue Whitesides, and won the 2005 NSERC Doctoral Prize of the Natural Sciences and Engineering Research Council.

Career
She was an NSERC Postdoctoral Fellow at Carleton University, a CRM-ISM Postdoctoral Fellow at McGill University, and a postdoctoral researcher again at Carleton University before finally becoming an assistant professor at Carleton University in 2012. She moved to the University of Ottawa in 2013, and became an associate professor there in 2018.

References

External links
Home page

Living people
Canadian computer scientists
Canadian mathematicians
Canadian women computer scientists
Canadian women mathematicians
Academic staff of Carleton University
Croatian emigrants to Canada
Graph theorists
McGill University alumni
Researchers in geometric algorithms
Academic staff of the University of Ottawa
University of Zagreb alumni
Year of birth missing (living people)